Shiledar was a term used for a soldier's position in India's Maratha Empire (1630–1818), particularly during the reign of Shivaji. The word shiledar means "a soldier who possesses his own sword and horse for taking active part in combat/war".

During Shivaji's rule, the Maratha army possessed many shiledars who mainly came from the "96 clans, 5 clans and 7 clans of the Maratha clan system. Due to their prominence they used to play active parts in the war held between Marathas and their enemies.

These shiledar, according to their deeds were identified as Subhedar, Panch Hajari, Havaldar, vatandar etc.

"Shiledar" became a surname in and after the fallen of maratha empire. After that, "Shiledar" become a royal family in Maharashtra.

Shiledars commonly belongs to many of clans in maratha caste."Shiledar Royal family" is the descendants of Shinde, Phalke and Bhoite families. 

Shiledar royal family settled in Derde-korhale (Kopargaon, Dist. Ahmednagar, Maharashtra) after which the descendents distributed in many of places like Nashik, Pune, Kokan etc. But their Royal palace (which had 7 floors) is in Derde-Korhale town.

See also 
Silladar Cavalry

References 
2005 Navneet General Knowledge. Editor - Madhusudan M. Pendase. Navneet Publications India LTD, Mumbai. 
Kṛishṇarāu Arjuna Keḷūskar, Nilakantha Sadāsiva Takakhāv. The Life of Shivaji Maharaj: Founder of the Maratha Empire. Manoranjan Press, 1921

Maratha Empire
Military history of India